Zevs or ZEVS may refer to:

 Zevs (artist), a French street artist
 ZEVS (transmitter), a Soviet/Russian submarine communication system

See also
 Zeus (disambiguation)